Lac-des-Écorces was a former unorganized territory in the Outaouais region of Quebec, Canada.

On October 10, 1998, it was split up between Duhamel and Montpellier and ceased to exist.

References

Former unorganized territories in Quebec
Populated places disestablished in 1998